Mikhail Pavlovich Bobyshov (November 7, 1885 – July 7, 1964) was a Soviet Russian painter and stage decorator, People's Artist of the Russian Federation, Honored Art worker of the Russian Federation, professor of the Repin Institute of Arts.

Biography 
Bobyshov was born in Pogoreloye, in the Tver Governorate of the Russian Empire.   In 1907 he graduated from the Central School of Technical Drawing of Daron Stieglitz, pupil of Vasily Savinsky, Matvey Chizhov. After graduation, received the title of artist and grant for overseas travel. Visited France, England, Italy, Spain. Take place in Art Exhibitions since 1912. In 1926-1964 he taught in the Repin Institute of Arts. As a theater artist began working in St. Petersburg since 1911. At the same time drew for magazines. He designed theatrical performances for the Maliy Opera Theatre, Leningrad Comedy Theatre, the State Academic Theater Opera and Ballet, the Moscow Opera Theater of Stanislavsky and the Maliy Theater, as well as theaters in Kiev, Sofia. Author of many paintings and drawings. His works reside in the State Russian Museum, Tretyakov Gallery, in many museums and private collections in Russia, France, Ukraine, Germany, and other countries. He died in Leningrad.

Pupils 
 Irina Baldina
 Yaroslav Krestovsky
 Igor Veselkin
 Nikolai Brandt
 Joseph Serebriany

See also 

 Fine Art of Leningrad

References

Sources 
 Голлербах Э., Янковский М. Михаил Павлович Бобышов. Живопись и театр. - Л., 1928.
 Богданов А. Полвека — искусству // Вечерний Ленинград. 1957, 21 ноября.
 Бетхер-Остренко И. Художественная летопись истории. // Вечерний Ленинград, 1964, 28 января.
 Бобышов Михаил Павлович. Выставка произведений. Каталог. Л., Художник РСФСР, 1964.
 Кручина В. Неувядающая молодость творчества // Вечерний Ленинград, 1964, 16 апреля.
 Художники народов СССР. Биобиблиографический словарь. Т.1. М., Искусство, 1970. С.418-419.
 Государственный Русский музей. Живопись. Первая половина ХХ века. Каталог. А—В. Т.8. СПб., Palace Edition, 1997. С.71-72.
 Sergei V. Ivanov. Unknown Socialist Realism. The Leningrad School. Saint Petersburg: NP-Print Edition, 2007.  P.14, 19, 357, 358, 362, 369, 373, 378–382, 385, 386, 389, 393, 394, 403, 441, 442. , .

External links 

1885 births
1964 deaths
People from Ostashkovsky District
People from Tver Governorate
Russian male painters
Soviet painters
Socialist realist artists
Leningrad School artists
Russian portrait painters
20th-century Russian male artists
20th-century Russian painters
Members of the Leningrad Union of Artists
People's Artists of the RSFSR (visual arts)